Herman Jacob Roth (March 6, 1896 – April 8, 1988), nicknamed "Bobby", was an American Negro league catcher in the 1920s.

A native of New Orleans, Louisiana, Roth made his Negro leagues debut in 1923 with the Milwaukee Bears and Chicago American Giants. He went on to play for the Detroit Stars and Birmingham Black Barons in the following two seasons. Roth died in New Orleans in 1988 at age 92.

References

External links
 and Seamheads

1896 births
1988 deaths
Birmingham Black Barons players
Chicago American Giants players
Detroit Stars players
Milwaukee Bears players
Baseball catchers
Baseball players from New Orleans
20th-century African-American sportspeople